Izvoare is a commune in Dolj County, Oltenia, Romania with a population of 2,103 people. It is composed of three villages: Corlate, Domnu Tudor and Izvoare.

Natives
 Lelia Constantza Băjenescu

References

Communes in Dolj County
Localities in Oltenia